Lesná may refer to several places:

Czech Republic
 Lesná (Pelhřimov District), a village in Pelhřimov District
 Lesná (Tachov District), a village in Tachov District
 Lesná (Třebíč District), a village in Třebíč District
 Lesná (Znojmo District), a village in Znojmo District

Slovakia
 Nová Lesná, a village in Poprad District
 Oravská Lesná, a village in Námestovo District
 Rajecká Lesná, a village in Žilina District
 Stará Lesná, a village in Kežmarok District
 Veľká Lesná, a village in Stará Ľubovňa District

See also
 Lesna (disambiguation)